Novi Štitnjak is a village in Požega-Slavonia County, Croatia. The village is administered as a part of the City of Požega. According to the national census of 2001, the population of the village is 112.

Sources

Populated places in Požega-Slavonia County